Sanjay Jha may refer to:

 Sanjay Jha (businessman), an Indian-American businessman
 Sanjay Jha (politician), a politician from Indian National Congress